Fanny Quenot (born 2 October 1990) is a French athlete. She competed in the women's 100 metres hurdles event at the 2019 World Athletics Championships.

References

External links
 

1990 births
Living people
French female hurdlers
Place of birth missing (living people)
World Athletics Championships athletes for France
Athletes (track and field) at the 2018 Mediterranean Games
Mediterranean Games competitors for France
European Games competitors for France
Athletes (track and field) at the 2019 European Games